Qızılca is a village and municipality in the Goygol District of Azerbaijan. It has a population of 2,703.  The municipality consists of the villages of Qızılca, Damcılı, Danayeri, Yalqışlaq, and Yeni Qızılca.

References

External links 

Populated places in Goygol District